The 1933 Campeonato Paulista was the 32nd season of São Paulo's top association football league. Two championships were disputed that season, each by a different league. On that year, the professionalism controversy flared up again, as in Rio de Janeiro, the Liga Carioca de Football was formed as a professional football league, in opposition to AMEA (Associação Metropolitana de Esportes Atléticos), which didn't allow professionalism. The national federation, CBD, took AMEA's side and refused to allow professionalism. As a consequence, in São Paulo, the state federation, APEA, which accepted professionalist practices since 1926, broke with CBD, and joined LCF to form the FBF (Federação Brasileira de Football). To counter that, CBD sponsored the formation of an amateur league in São Paulo, the Federação Paulista de Football, to compete with APEA.

Meanwhile, FBF created the Rio-São Paulo Tournament, with the presence of all of APEA's teams, except for Sírio, and as such, all of the matches of their Campeonato Paulista, except for those involving Sírio, were valid for that tournament as well.

APEA Championship

In the edition organized by the APEA (Associação Paulista de Esportes Atléticos), Palestra Itália won the title for the 5th time. no teams were relegated and the top scorer was São Paulo's Valdemar de Brito with 21 goals.

System
The championship was disputed in a double round-robin system, with the team with the most points winning the title.

Championship

FPF Championship

In the edition organized by the FPF, which is not recognized by the present-day FPF as an official Paulista championship, Albion won the title for the 1st time. Thirteen teams signed up for that championship, with three of the most important sides withdrawing even before the start of the championship, leaving only ten teams. Paulista won the Torneio Início, but withdrew before the championship proper started as well, leaving nine. By December, only five teams were left, with two teams withdrawing at the end of the First round and the other two withdrawing midway through the second round.

System
The championship was disputed in a double round-robin format, with the team with the most points winning the title.

Championship

References

Campeonato Paulista seasons
Paulista